Federico Delbonis was the defending champion but chose not to defend his title.

Jan Šátral won the title after defeating Robin Haase 6–3, 6–2 in the final.

Seeds

Draw

Finals

Top half

Bottom half

References
 Main Draw
 Qualifying Draw

BFD Energy Challenger - Singles